The 2009 OFC Beach Soccer championship also known as the 2009 FIFA Beach Soccer World Cup qualifiers for (OFC) was the third beach soccer championship for Oceania, held from late July, in Moorea, Tahiti, French Polynesia.
The Solomon Islands won the championship and moved on to play in the 2009 FIFA Beach Soccer World Cup in Dubai, United Arab Emirates from July 27 to July 31.
4 Oceanian teams played a group stage. The first 2 played each other for the only ticket to the 2009 FIFA Beach Soccer World Cup.  3rd and 4th place played each other for the 3rd place in the final standing.

Group stage

Third-place play-off

Final

Winners

Final standing

References 

Bea
2009
FIFA Beach Soccer World Cup qualification (OFC)
Beach
2009 in beach soccer